Çakırkaş is a village in the Kovancılar District of Elazığ Province in Turkey. Its population is 1,230 (2021). Before the 2013 reorganisation, it was a town (belde). The village is populated by Kurds.

References

Villages in Kovancılar District
Kurdish settlements in Elazığ Province